The Stieglitz rearrangement is a rearrangement reaction in organic chemistry which is named after the American chemist Julius Stieglitz (1867–1937) and was first investigated by him and Paul Nicholas Leech in 1913. It describes the 1,2-rearrangement of trityl amine derivatives to triaryl imines. It is comparable to a Beckmann rearrangement which also involves a substitution at a nitrogen atom through a carbon to nitrogen shift. As an example, triaryl hydroxylamines can undergo a Stieglitz rearrangement by dehydration and the shift of a phenyl group after activation with phosphorus pentachloride to yield the respective triaryl imine, a Schiff base.

In general, the term "Stieglitz rearrangement" is used to describe a wide variety of rearrangement reactions of amines to imines. Although, it is generally associated with the rearrangement of triaryl hydroxylamines, that are well-reported in the academic literature, Stieglitz rearrangements can also occur on alkylated amine derivatives, haloamines and azides as well as other activated amine derivatives.

General mechanism and relatedness to the Beckmann rearrangement

The Stieglitz rearrangement's reaction mechanism and the products and starting materials involved make it closely related to the Beckmann rearrangement, which can be used for the synthesis of carboxamides. Both rearrangement reactions involve a carbon to nitrogen shift, usually after electrophilic activation of the leaving group on the nitrogen atom. The main difference in the starting materials, however, is their saturation degree. While a Stieglitz rearrangement takes place on saturated amine derivatives with a σ-single bond, the typical starting material for a Beckmann rearrangement is an oxime (a hydroxylimine) with a C=N-double bond. 
In a Beckmann rearrangement, the acid catalyzed carbon to nitrogen migration takes place on the oxime to yield a nitrilium ion intermediate. In principle, the first step of a Stieglitz rearrangement proceeds in an analogous way. However, after the generation of the positively charged iminium ion through the π-interaction between the nitrogen lone pair and the electron deficient carbon in the Stieglitz rearrangement, the pathways diverge. In the Stieglitz rearrangement, a charge-neutral state of the molecule can be achieved by dissociation of a proton. Alternatively, if the  starting material did not possess any amino protons, the neutral state can be achieved with an external reducing agent, such as sodium borohydride. It reduces the iminium ion intermediate to the corresponding saturated amine. In the Beckmann rearrangement such a proton is also missing and the stabilization of the intermediate proceeds via a nucleophilic addition of a water molecule, dissociation of a proton and tautomerism from the imidic acid to the carboxamide.

Variations
Although the original Stieglitz reaction is best known for the rearrangement of trityl hydroxylamines, there are several variations which include good leaving groups as N-substituents (such as halogens and sulfonates). Different reagents are commonly applied, depending on the exact nature of the substrate.

Stieglitz rearrangement of N-hydroxylated amines, N-alkoxylated amines and N-sulfonated amines

Stieglitz rearrangement of N-hydroxylated amines
For the rearrangement of trityl hydroxylamines, Lewis acids such as phosphorus pentachloride (PCl5) , phosphorus pentoxide (P2O5)  or boron trifluoride (BF3) can be used. They function as electrophilic activators for the hydroxyl group by increasing the quality of the leaving group. 
For example, when using PCl5 as a reagent, the trityl hydroxylamine is first transformed into the activated intermediate via a nucleophilic substitution. The generated intermediate can then undergo rearrangement by the migration of the phenyl group and dissociation of the phosphorus(V) species to form N-phenyl benzophenone imine.

Stieglitz rearrangement of N-alkoxylated amines
Additionally to N-hydroxy trityl amines, rearrangements in N-alkoxy trityl amines are also possible. However, those reactions are known for their intrinsically low yields. For example, N-benzyloxy substituted trityl amine can undergo a Stieglitz rearrangement in the presence of phosphorus pentachloride (160 °C, 40% yield) or with BF3 as a reagent (60 °C, 29% yield). In the latter case, BF3 acts as a Lewis acid in the electrophilic activation of the benzylic oxygen to allow for a nucleophilic attack on the adjacent nitrogen atom.

Stieglitz rearrangement of N-sulfonated amines
Stieglitz rearrangements also readily proceed with active sulfonates as a leaving group. N-sulfonated amines can be obtained from the respective hydroxylamines and suitable sulfonation reagents. For example, Herderin et al. synthesized their secondary hydroxylamine (starting material in the rearrangement shown below) by subjecting the respective hydroxylamine to tosyl chloride and sodium hydroxide in acetonitrile.

The Stieglitz rearrangement is especially reactive in the case of bridged bicyclic N-sulfonated amines as starting materials, where mild conditions are sufficient for an efficient reaction to take place. For example, the rearrangement of the bicyclic N-tosylated amine proceeds readily in aqueous dioxane at room temperature. However, the respective imine is not formed in this case, presumably due to the strain that would thermodynamically disfavor such a structure, bearing a double bond at a bridgehead atom (Bredt's rule). Instead, the tosylate is nucleophilically added at the geminal position of the nitrogen via an attack on the iminium ion.

Stieglitz rearrangement of azides
Stieglitz rearrangements can also proceed on organic azides with molecular nitrogen as a good leaving group. Those reactions proceed comparably to steps of the Schmidt reaction, by which carboxylic acids can be transformed into amines through the addition of hydrazoic acid under acidic aqueous conditions.
The Stieglitz rearrangement of azides generally profits from a protonic or thermal activation, which can also be combined. In both cases, molecular nitrogen is set free as a gas in an irreversible step. It has been suggested that the rearrangement, after the dissociation of the N2 molecule, proceeds over a reactive nitrene intermediate. These intermediates would be quite similar to those that have been proposed to be key intermediates in the rearrangement reactions named after Hofmann and Curtius, but have since been considered unlikely.
When subjecting the azide to a Brønsted acid, the protonation of the azide activates the basal nitrogen and lowers the bond strength to the adjacent one, so that the dissociation and expulsion of molecular nitrogen is eased. After the rearrangement the proton can then dissociate from the iminium ion to yield the imine.

An alternative way for the production of protonated organic azides is the nuclophilic addition of hydrazoic acid to a carbocations, which can then also undergo Stieglitz rearrangements.

Stieglitz rearrangement of N-halogenated amines

The Stieglitz rearrangement of N-halogenated amines can be observed for chlorine and bromine substituted amines, often in combination with an organic base, such as sodium methoxide. The need for a base is generally affiliated with the need for a deprotonation of the amine.

However, there also have been reported examples of base-free Stieglitz rearrangements of N-halogenated amines. An example for that can be found in the total synthesis of (±)-lycopodine by Paul Grieco et al. There, a ring formation takes place by a rearrangement on a secondary haloamine by subjecting it to silver tetrafluoroborate. AgBF4 is known to act as a source of Ag+ ions that can facilitate the dissociation of halides from organic molecules, with the formation of the respective silver halide as a driving force. The desired product is then obtained by reduction with sodium cyanoborohydride, a mild reducing agent which is commonly employed in the reduction of imines to amines.

Stieglitz rearrangement of lead tetraacetate-activated amines
It was also observed, that the addition of lead tetraacetate can facilitate the Stieglitz rearrangement of amine derivatives. After the formation of the activated amine derivative intermediate by coordination to the lead center, the following rearrangement again proceeds via migration of the aromatic group under formation of a C–N bond, dissociation of lead and the deprotonation of the resulting iminium ion.

See also
 Beckmann rearrangement
 Curtius rearrangement
 Dakin oxidation
 Schmidt reaction

References

Rearrangement reactions
Name reactions